The Western Australian Turf Club (WATC), later known as Perth Racing, was established in late nineteenth century as an elite social institution and administrator of the Western Australian horse racing industry.  They manage two racecourses in Perth, Ascot Racecourse and Belmont Park Racecourse.

Some aspects of the clubs functions were taken over by Racing and Wagering Western Australia when it was created in 2003.

At its establishment the Turf Club was modelled on the English Turf Clubs, mixing the political and economic elite of the empire, and one of two key social clubs for the related or intermarried families with overlapping interests in city businesses and agriculture. Consequently, most members of the legislative body were also members of the Turf and Weld Clubs, allowing the opportunity for private resolution of their mutual interests. Conversely, the notion amongst the populace until the 1940s was said to be that it would easier to be admitted to parliament than the Turf Club. The membership was composed of those who were born to successful colonials in Australia or from the titled families, or legal and medical professionals, newly arrived from England and receiving appointments in the administration of the state.

Publishing
 The Western Australian racing calendar. Perth, W.A : Western Australian Turf Club, 1890-1985.
 Racing calendar. Perth, W.A : Western Australian Turf Club, 1985-1999.
 Racing Western Australia. Belmont, W.A. : Western Australian Turf Club, 1999-2005.

Histories
 Cusack, S. F.(1936) Horse racing in Western Australia, 1833-1900. Journal and proceedings (Western Australian Historical Society) Vol. 2, pt. 19 (1936), p. 47-58
 Brief history of the club to 1912.Cyclopedia of Western Australia edited by James_Battye, Vol.2, p. 385-386.
 W.A. Turf Club centenary, 1852-1952. [Perth, W.A] : Periodicals Division, West Australian Newspapers.
 Tomlinson, Jenny.(1990) Born winners, born losers : a history of thoroughbred breeding and racing in Western Australia since 1833 Perth, W.A : Reeve Books.

References

External links
 http://www.perthracing.com.au/

Sporting clubs in Perth, Western Australia
Horse racing organisations in Australia